The 1998 North Texas Mean Green football team represented the University of North Texas in the 1998 NCAA Division I-A football season. The Mean Green played their home games at the Fouts Field in Denton, Texas, and competed in the Big West Conference. They were led by first-year head coach Darrell Dickey, who took over for Matt Simon. Dickey had been hired away from SMU, serving as their offensive coordinator and quarterbacks coach the year prior. The team finished the regular season with a 3-8 overall record with a 3-2 mark in Big West play.

Previous season
North Texas failed to improve on their 4-7 record in 1997.

Schedule

References

North Texas
North Texas Mean Green football seasons
North Texas Mean Green football